The Catania Observatory is an astronomical observatory in the city of Catania, on the island of Sicily in southern Italy.  It is operated by INAF, the National Institute for Astrophysics.

See also
 List of astronomical observatories

References

External links
Observatory home page

Catania
Astrophysical Observatory